Losing Ground is a 2005 independent film directed by Bryan Wizemann adapted from Wizemann's play of the same name. It follows seven people over the course of a single night in a Las Vegas video-poker bar, and their tangled interactions.

The film features the same cast as the stage performance and was filmed using high-definition video at The Gate, a bar in Park Slope. Losing Ground premiered at the Cinequest Film Festival on March 11, 2005, to generally favorable reviews. The film was distributed to a small number of theaters in New York City. It was released on DVD January 26, 2009.

Plot summary

Cast
 Eileen O'Connell
 Kendall Pigg
 Matthew Mark Meyer
 Monique Vukovic
 Rhonda Keyser
 John Good
 Colm Byrne

Stage production
The play initially ran at Tom Noonan's Paradise Theater from March 29, 2003, to April 13, 2003.

References

External links
 Official site
 
 
 

American independent films